Deschampsia wacei is a species of grass in the family Poaceae.  It is found in Tristan da Cunha in the South Atlantic.  Its natural habitat is swamps.

References

wacei
Flora of Tristan da Cunha
Data deficient plants
Taxonomy articles created by Polbot